Cynthia Hyla Whittaker (born 1942) is an American academic and author. As a historian, she specializes in the history of Eastern Europe, especially the Russian Empire and of the Soviet Union. She built her career while teaching courses in the subject at Baruch College.

Biography

Early life
Cynthia Hyla Whittaker was born in 1942. She received an undergraduate degree from Marymount College in Tarrytown, New York in 1962. She received advanced degrees in Russian history and literature from Indiana University at Bloomington.

Career
Whittaker has taught courses in Eastern European history at both the undergraduate and graduate levels at Baruch College since 1984, and is currently Chair of the History Department there. Whittaker is a Fulbright Scholar and has received research grants from—among others—the Harriman and Kennan Institutes, as well as the Rockefeller Foundation.

From 1999–2000 she was a visiting fellow at the Slavic Research Center of Hokkaido University in Japan. From October 2003 to May 2004 she co-curated a museum exhibit entitled Russia Engages the World, 1453-1825 at the New York Public Library.

Bibliography

Books

Translated into Russian as Graf Sergej Semenovič Uvarov i ego vremja. Sankt-Peterburg: Gumanitarnoe Agentstvo "Akademičeskij Proėkt", 1999.,
Reviewed in   American Historical Review,;  Canadian Slavonic Papers Jahrbücher für Geschichte Osteuropas,;  Slavic Review;  Russian Review, and History of Education Quarterly,  

Reviewed in  Slavic and East European journal.,  Russian Review,, American historical review.  Canadian-American Slavic studies.;   Slavic review,; and  Groniek.   

Reviewed in: Slavic and East European journal.''';<ref>'Slavic and East European journal. 51, no. 4, (2007): 827</ref> Solanus     European History Quarterly,   and Jahrbücher für Geschichte Osteuropas,

Journal articles
  
  

  

Whittaker is currently working on an intellectual biography of Catherine the Great.

References

Living people
1942 births
Baruch College faculty
Historians of Russia